Feuillade may refer to:

 People
 Louis Feuillade (1873–1925), French film director
 Louis d'Aubusson de la Feuillade (1673–1725), Marshal of France

 French communes
 Feuillade, Charente, in the Charente department
 La Feuillade, in the Dordogne department